Blue Thunder is an American action drama television series based on the movie of the same title that aired on ABC from January 6 until April 16, 1984, featuring the Blue Thunder helicopter.

The series uses the converted Aérospatiale Gazelle helicopter and large portions of stock footage from the 1983 film. A ground unit named "Rolling Thunder" backed up the helicopter in the television series. This was a large support van with a desert camouflage off-road vehicle stored inside.

The television series cast includes James Farentino, Dana Carvey, and former professional American football players Bubba Smith and Dick Butkus. The series was canceled by ABC after getting low ratings.

Eleven episodes were made before the series was canceled.

Cast 
James Farentino as Frank Chaney, protagonist, policeman and pilot of the "Blue Thunder".
Dana Carvey as Clinton Wonderlove, aka "JAFO", Frank's flight engineer on "Blue Thunder", as well as his sidekick. Clinton handles technical aspects of the chopper.
Sandy McPeak as Captain Braddock, Frank's superior.
Bubba Smith         as     "Bubba" Kelsey, a cop who is one of the two members of "Rolling Thunder", Frank's ground crew.
Dick Butkus         as     "Ski" Butowski, another cop who is the other member of "Rolling Thunder".
Ann Cooper as J.J. Douglas, radio operator who is Frank's contact at headquarters, and the only female regular in the series.

Episode list

US television ratings

Home media
Sony Pictures Home Entertainment released the complete series on DVD in Region 1 on August 22, 2006.
A Region 2 release followed on September 27, 2010.

References

External links

Blue Thunder series page on tvacres.com
Blue Thunder TV series page on gregdonner.org & episode guide

1984 American television series debuts
1984 American television series endings
1980s American drama television series
Television shows set in Los Angeles
American Broadcasting Company original programming
Television series by Sony Pictures Television
Aviation television series
English-language television shows
American action television series
Live action television shows based on films